Eduardo Castro Zialcita is a Filipino public servant and businessman. He was Representative for the 1st District of Parañaque until 2010.

References

1950 births
People from Manila
People from Parañaque
Living people
Lakas–CMD (1991) politicians
Members of the House of Representatives of the Philippines from Parañaque